Pogliano Milanese is a comune (municipality) in the Province of Milan in the Italian region Lombardy, located about  northwest of Milan.

Pogliano Milanese borders the following municipalities: Lainate, Nerviano, Rho, Vanzago, Pregnana Milanese, Arluno.

References

External links
 Official website

Cities and towns in Lombardy